Marlboro is a hamlet in west-central Alberta, Canada within Yellowhead County. Sundance Provincial Park is located northwest of the hamlet.

Statistics Canada recognizes Marlboro as a designated place.

Demographics 

See also 
List of communities in Alberta
List of designated places in Alberta
List of hamlets in Alberta

References 

Designated places in Alberta
Hamlets in Alberta
Yellowhead County